Stockton is a populated place within the Municipality of Glenboro – South Cypress, Manitoba, Canada.  The Stockton United Church was built in 1891 and was in use until the late 1960s.  Stockton's postal code is R0K 2E0.

References

Unincorporated communities in Manitoba